Jonah or Jonas, son of Amittai, is a prophet in the Hebrew Bible from Gath-hepher of the northern kingdom of Israel in about the 8th century BCE. Jonah is the central figure of the Book of Jonah, which details his reluctance in delivering God's judgement on the city of Nineveh. Subsequently he returns to the divine mission after he is swallowed by a large sea creature and then released.

In Judaism, the story of Jonah represents the teaching of teshuva, which is the ability to repent and be forgiven by God. In the New Testament, Jesus calls himself "greater than Jonah" and promises the Pharisees "the sign of Jonah", which is his resurrection. Early Christian interpreters viewed Jonah as a type for Jesus. Jonah is regarded as a prophet in Islam, and the biblical narrative of Jonah is repeated in the Quran. Mainstream Bible scholars generally regard the Book of Jonah as fictional, and often at least partially satirical. The character of Jonah son of Amittai may have been based on the historical prophet of the same name who prophesied during the reign of Amaziah of Judah, as mentioned in 2 Kings.

Although the creature that swallowed Jonah is often depicted in art and culture as a whale, the Hebrew text uses the phrase dag gadol, which means "big fish". In the seventeenth and early eighteenth centuries, the species of the fish that swallowed Jonah was the subject of speculation by naturalists, who interpreted the story as an account of a historical incident. Some modern scholars of folklore, on the other hand, note similarities between Jonah and other legendary religious and mythical figures, specifically Gilgamesh and the Greek hero Jason.

Book of Jonah

Jonah is the central character in the Book of Jonah, in which God commands him to go to the city of Nineveh to prophesy against it "for their great wickedness is come up before me," but Jonah instead attempts to flee from "the presence of the Lord" by going to Jaffa (sometimes transliterated as Joppa or Joppe). He sets sail for Tarshish. A huge storm arises and the sailors, realizing that it is no ordinary storm, cast lots and discover that Jonah is to blame. Jonah admits this and says that if he is thrown overboard, the storm will cease. The sailors refuse to do this and continue rowing, but all their efforts fail, and they eventually throw Jonah overboard. As a result, the storm calms and the sailors offer sacrifices to God.

After being cast from the ship, Jonah is swallowed by a large fish, within the belly of which he remains for three days and three nights. While in the great fish, Jonah prays to God in his affliction and commits to giving thanks and to paying what he has vowed. God commands the fish to vomit Jonah out.

God again commands Jonah to travel to Nineveh and prophesy to its inhabitants. This time he travels there and enters the city, crying, "In forty days Nineveh shall be overthrown." After Jonah has walked across Nineveh, the people begin to believe his word and proclaim a fast. The king of Nineveh puts on sackcloth and sits in ashes, making a proclamation which decrees fasting, the wearing of sackcloth, prayer, and repentance. God sees their repentant hearts and spares the city at that time. The entire city is humbled and broken, with the people (and even the animals) wearing sackcloth and ashes.

Displeased by this, Jonah refers to his earlier flight to Tarshish while asserting that, since God is merciful, it was inevitable that God would turn from the threatened calamities. He leaves the city and makes a shelter, waiting to see whether or not the city will be destroyed. God causes a plant (in Hebrew a kikayon) to grow over Jonah's shelter to give him some shade from the sun. Later, God causes a worm to bite the plant's root and it withers. Jonah, exposed to the full force of the sun, becomes faint and pleads for God to kill him.

Religious views

In Judaism

The Book of Jonah (Yonah יונה) is one of the twelve minor prophets included in the Tanakh. According to one tradition, Jonah was the boy brought back to life by Elijah the prophet in 1 Kings. Another tradition holds that he was the son of the woman of Shunem brought back to life by Elisha in 2 Kings and that he is called the "son of Amittai" (Truth) due to his mother's recognition of Elisha's identity as a prophet in 2 Kings. The Book of Jonah is read every year, in its original Hebrew and in its entirety, on Yom Kippur – the Day of Atonement – as the Haftarah at the afternoon mincha prayer. According to Rabbi Eliezer, the fish that swallowed Jonah was created in the primordial era and the inside of its mouth was like a synagogue; the fish's eyes were like windows and a pearl inside its mouth provided further illumination.

According to the Midrash, while Jonah was inside the fish, it told him that its life was nearly over because soon the Leviathan would eat them both. Jonah promised the fish that he would save them. Following Jonah's directions, the fish swam up alongside the Leviathan and Jonah threatened to leash the Leviathan by its tongue and let the other fish eat it. The Leviathan heard Jonah's threats, saw that he was circumcised, and realized that he was protected by the Lord, so it fled in terror, leaving Jonah and the fish alive. The medieval Jewish scholar and rabbi Abraham ibn Ezra (1092–1167) argued against any literal interpretation of the Book of Jonah, stating that the "experiences of all the prophets except Moses were visions, not actualities." The later scholar Isaac Abarbanel (1437–1509), however, argued that Jonah could have easily survived in the belly of the fish for three days, because "after all, fetuses live nine months without access to fresh air."

Teshuva – the ability to repent and be forgiven by God – is a prominent idea in Jewish thought. This concept is developed in the Book of Jonah: Jonah, the son of truth (the name of his father "Amitai" in Hebrew means truth), refuses to ask the people of Nineveh to repent. He seeks the truth only, and not forgiveness. When forced to go, his call is heard loud and clear. The people of Nineveh repent ecstatically, "fasting, including the sheep," and the Jewish scripts are critical of this. The Book of Jonah also highlights the sometimes unstable relationship between two religious needs: comfort and truth.

In Christianity

In the Book of Tobit
Jonah is mentioned twice in the fourteenth chapter of the deuterocanonical Book of Tobit, the conclusion of which finds Tobit's son, Tobias, rejoicing at the news of Nineveh's destruction by Nebuchadnezzar and Ahasuerus in apparent fulfillment of Jonah's prophecy against the Assyrian capital.

In the New Testament

In the New Testament, Jonah is mentioned in the gospels of Matthew and Luke. In Matthew, Jesus makes a reference to Jonah when he is asked for a sign by some of the scribes and the Pharisees. Jesus says that the sign will be the sign of Jonah: Jonah's restoration after three days and three night inside the great fish prefigures His own resurrection.

Jonah is regarded as a saint by a number of Christian denominations. His feast day in the Roman Catholic Church is on 21 September, according to the Martyrologium Romanum. On the Eastern Orthodox liturgical calendar, Jonah's feast day is on 22 September (for those churches which follow the traditional Julian calendar; 22 September currently falls in October on the modern Gregorian calendar). In the Armenian Apostolic Church, moveable feasts are held in commemoration of Jonah as a single prophet and as one of the Twelve Minor Prophets. Jonah's mission to the Ninevites is commemorated by the Fast of Nineveh in Syriac and Oriental Orthodox Churches. Jonah is commemorated as a prophet in the Calendar of Saints of the Missouri Synod of the Lutheran Church on 22 September.

Christian theologians have traditionally interpreted Jonah as a type for Jesus Christ. Jonah being in swallowed by the giant fish was regarded as a foreshadowing of Jesus's crucifixion and Jonah emerging from the fish after three days was seen as a parallel for Jesus emerging from the tomb after three days. Saint Jerome equates Jonah with Jesus's more nationalistic side, and justifies Jonah's actions by arguing that "Jonah acts thus as a patriot, not so much that he hates the Ninevites, as that he does not want to destroy his own people."

Other Christian interpreters, including Saint Augustine and Martin Luther, have taken a directly opposite approach, regarding Jonah as the epitome of envy and jealousness, which they regarded as inherent characteristics of the Jewish people. Luther likewise concludes that the kikayon represents Judaism, and that the worm which devours it represents Christ. Luther also questioned the idea that the Book of Jonah was ever intended as literal history, commenting that he found it hard to believe that anyone would have interpreted it as such if it had never been included in the Bible. Luther's antisemitic interpretation of Jonah remained the prevailing interpretation among German Protestants throughout early modern history. J. D. Michaelis comments that "the meaning of the fable hits you right between the eyes", and concludes that the Book of Jonah is a polemic against "the Israelite people's hate and envy towards all the other nations of the earth." Albert Eichhorn was a strong supporter of Michaelis's interpretation.

John Calvin and John Hooper regarded the Book of Jonah as a warning to all those who might attempt to flee from the wrath of God. While Luther had been careful to maintain that the Book of Jonah was not written by Jonah, Calvin declared that the Book of Jonah was Jonah's personal confession of guilt. Calvin sees Jonah's time inside the fish's belly as equivalent to the fires of Hell, intended to correct Jonah and set him on the path of righteousness. Also unlike Luther, Calvin finds fault with all the characters in the story, describing the sailors on the boat as "hard and iron-hearted, like Cyclops'", the penitence of the Ninevites as "untrained", and the king of Nineveh as a "novice". Hooper, on the other hand, sees Jonah as the archetypal dissident and the ship he is cast out from as a symbol of the state. Hooper deplores such dissidents, decrying: "Can you live quietly with so many Jonasses? Nay then, throw them into the sea!" In the eighteenth century, German professors were forbidden from teaching that the Book of Jonah was anything other than a literal, historical account.

In Islam

Quran
Jonah is the title of the tenth chapter of the Quran. Yūnus is traditionally viewed as highly important in Islam as a prophet who was faithful to God and delivered His messages. Jonah is the only one of Judaism's Twelve Minor Prophets to be named in the Quran. In Quran 21:87 and 68:48, Jonah is called Dhul-Nūn (meaning "The One of the Fish"). In 4:163 and 6:86, he is referred to as "an apostle of Allah". Surah 37:139–148 retells the full story of Jonah:

The Quran never mentions Jonah's father, but Muslim tradition teaches that Jonah was from the tribe of Benjamin and that his father was Amittai.

Hadiths

Jonah is also mentioned in a few incidents during the lifetime of Muhammad. Quraysh sent their servant, Addas, to serve him grapes for sustenance. Muhammad asked Addas where he was from and the servant replied Nineveh. "The town of Jonah the just, son of Amittai!" Muhammad exclaimed. Addas was shocked because he knew that the pagan Arabs had no knowledge of the prophet Jonah. He then asked how Muhammad knew of this man. "We are brothers," Muhammad replied. "Jonah was a Prophet of God and I, too, am a Prophet of God." Addas immediately accepted Islam and kissed the hands and feet of Muhammad.

One of the sayings attributed to Muhammad, in the collection of Imam Bukhari, says that Muhammad said "One should not say that I am better than Jonah".  Umayya ibn Abi al-Salt, an older contemporary of Muhammad, taught that, had Jonah not prayed to Allah, he would have remained trapped inside the fish until Judgement Day, but, because of his prayer, Jonah "stayed only a few days within the belly of the fish".

The ninth-century Persian historian Al-Tabari records that, while Jonah was inside the fish, "none of his bones or members were injured". Al-Tabari also writes that Allah made the body of the fish transparent, allowing Jonah to see the "wonders of the deep" and that Jonah heard all the fish singing praises to Allah. Kisai Marvazi, a tenth-century poet, records that Jonah's father was seventy years old when Jonah was born and that he died soon afterwards, leaving Jonah's mother with nothing but a wooden spoon, which turned out to be a cornucopia.

Claimed tombs

Nineveh's current location is marked by excavations of five gates, parts of walls on four sides, and two large mounds: the hill of Kuyunjik and hill of Nabi Yunus. A mosque atop Nabi Yunus was dedicated to the prophet Jonah and contained a shrine, which was revered by both Muslims and Christians as the site of Jonah's tomb. The tomb was a popular pilgrimage site and a symbol of unity to Jews, Christians, and Muslims across the Middle East. On July 24, 2014, the Islamic State of Iraq and the Levant (ISIL) destroyed the mosque containing the tomb as part of a campaign to destroy religious sanctuaries it deemed to be idolatrous. After Mosul was taken back from ISIL in January 2017, an ancient Assyrian palace built by Esarhaddon dating to around the first half of the 7th century BCE was discovered beneath the ruined mosque. ISIL had plundered the palace of items to sell on the black market, but some of the artifacts that were more difficult to transport still remained in place.

Other reputed locations of Jonah's tomb include:

 the Arab village of Mashhad, located on the ancient site of Gath-hepher in Israel; 
 a sanctuary near the city of Sarafand (Sarepta) in Lebanon; 
 a hill now called Giv'at Yonah, "Jonah's Hill", at the northern edge of the Israeli town of Ashdod, at a site covered by a modern lighthouse;
 a "tomb of Jonah" in the city of Diyarbakir, Turkey, located behind the mihrab at Fatih Pasha Mosque – Evliya Çelebi states in his Seyahatname that he visited the tombs of prophet Jonah and prophet George in the city.

Scholarly interpretations
The story of a man surviving after being swallowed by a whale or giant fish is classified in the catalogue of folktale types as ATU 1889G.

Historicity
Many Biblical scholars hold that the contents of the Book of Jonah are ahistorical. Although the prophet Jonah allegedly lived in the eighth century BCE, the Book of Jonah was written centuries later during the time of the Achaemenid Empire. The Hebrew used in the Book of Jonah shows strong influences from Aramaic and the cultural practices described in it match those of the Achaemenid Persians. Some scholars regard the Book of Jonah as an intentional work of parody or satire. If this is the case, then it was probably admitted into the canon of the Hebrew Bible by sages who misunderstood its satirical nature and mistakenly interpreted it as a serious prophetic work.

While the Book of Jonah itself is considered fiction, Jonah himself may have been a historical prophet; he is briefly mentioned in the Second Book of Kings:

Parodic elements

The views expressed by Jonah in the Book of Jonah are a parody of views held by members of Jewish society at the time when it was written. The primary target of the satire may have been a faction whom Morton Smith calls "Separationists", who believed that God would destroy those who disobeyed him, that sinful cities would be obliterated, and that God's mercy did not extend to those outside the Abrahamic covenant. McKenzie and Graham remark that "Jonah is in some ways the most 'orthodox' of Israelite theologians – to make a theological point." Jonah's statements throughout the book are characterized by their militancy, but his name ironically means "dove", a bird which the ancient Israelites associated with peace.

Jonah's rejection of God's commands is a parody of the obedience of the prophets described in other Old Testament writings. The king of Nineveh's instant repentance parodies the rulers throughout the other writings of the Old Testament who disregard prophetic warnings, such as Ahab and Zedekiah. The readiness to worship God displayed by the sailors on the ship and the people of Nineveh contrasts ironically with Jonah's own reluctance, as does Jonah's greater love for kikayon providing him shade than for all the people in Nineveh.

The Book of Jonah also employs elements of literary absurdism; it exaggerates the size of the city of Nineveh to an implausible degree and incorrectly refers to the administrator of the city as a "king". According to scholars, no human being could realistically survive for three days inside a fish, and the description of the livestock in Nineveh fasting alongside their owners is "silly".

The motif of a protagonist being swallowed by a giant fish or whale became a stock trope of later satirical writings. Similar incidents are recounted in Lucian of Samosata's A True Story, which was written in the second century CE, and in the novel Baron Munchausen's Narrative of his Marvellous Travels and Campaigns in Russia, published by Rudolf Erich Raspe in 1785.

The fish

Translation

Though art and culture often depicts Jonah's fish as a whale, the Hebrew text, as throughout scripture, refers to no marine species in particular, simply saying "great fish" or "big fish" (modern taxonomists classify whales as mammals and not as fish, but cultures in antiquity made no such distinction). While some biblical scholars suggest the size and habits of the great white shark correspond better to the representations of Jonah's experiences, normally an adult human is too large to be swallowed whole. The development of whaling from the 18th century onwards made it clear that most, if not all, species of whale could not swallow a human, leading to much controversy about the veracity of the biblical story of Jonah.

In Jonah 2:1 (1:17 in English translations), the Hebrew text reads dag gadol (דג גדול) or, in the Hebrew Masoretic Text, dāḡ gā·ḏō·wl (דָּ֣ג גָּד֔וֹל), which means "great fish". The Septuagint translates this phrase into Greek as kētei megalōi (κήτει μεγάλῳ), meaning "huge fish". In Greek mythology, the same word meaning "fish" (kêtos) is used to describe the sea monster slain by the hero Perseus that nearly devoured the Princess Andromeda. Jerome later translated this phrase as piscis grandis in his Latin Vulgate. He translated kétos, however, as ventre ceti in Matthew 12:40: this second case occurs only in this verse of the New Testament.

At some point cetus became synonymous with "whale" (the study of whales is now called cetology). In his 1534 translation, William Tyndale translated the phrase in Jonah 2:1 as "greate fyshe" and the word kétos (Greek) or cetus (Latin) in Matthew 12:40 as "whale". Tyndale's translation was later incorporated into the Authorized Version of 1611. Since then, the "great fish" in Jonah 2 has been most often interpreted as a whale. In English some translations use the word "whale" for Matthew 12:40, while others use "sea creature" or "big fish".

Scientific speculation

In the seventeenth and eighteenth centuries, naturalists, interpreting the Jonah story as a historical account, became obsessed with trying to identify the exact species of the fish that swallowed Jonah. In the mid-nineteenth century, Edward Bouverie Pusey, professor of Hebrew at Oxford University, claimed that the Book of Jonah must have been authored by Jonah himself and argued that the fish story must be historically true, or else it would not have been included in the Bible. Pusey attempted to scientifically catalogue the fish, hoping to "shame those who speak of the miracle of Jonah's preservation in the fish as a thing less credible than any of God's other miraculous doings".

The debate over the fish in the Book of Jonah played a major role during Clarence Darrow's cross-examination of William Jennings Bryan at the Scopes Trial in 1925. Darrow asked Bryan "When you read that ... the whale swallowed Jonah ... how do you literally interpret that?" Bryan replied that he believed in "a God who can make a whale and can make a man and make both of them do what He pleases." Bryan ultimately admitted that it was necessary to interpret the Bible, and is generally regarded as having come off looking like a "buffoon".

The largest of all whales – blue whales – are baleen whales which eat plankton; and "it is commonly said that this species would be choked if it attempted to swallow a herring."
As for the whale shark, Dr. E. W. Gudger, an Honorary Associate in Ichthyology at the American Museum of Natural History, notes that, while the whale shark does have a large mouth, its throat is only four inches wide, with a sharp elbow or bend behind the opening, meaning that not even a human arm would be able to pass through it. He concludes that "the whale shark is not the fish that swallowed Jonah."

Sperm whales, however, appear to be a different matter: They regularly eat giant squid, so presumably one could swallow a human. Similar to a cow, sperm whales have four-chambered stomachs. The first chamber has no gastric juices but has muscular walls to crush its food. On the other hand, it is not possible to breathe inside the sperm whale's stomach because there is no air (but probably methane instead).

Cultural influence

In Turkish, "Jonah fish" (in Turkish yunus baligi) is the term used for dolphins. A long-established expression among sailors uses the term, "a Jonah", to mean a sailor or a passenger whose presence on board brings bad luck and endangers the ship. Later, this meaning was extended to mean, "a person who carries a jinx, one who will bring bad luck to any enterprise."

Despite its brevity, the Book of Jonah has been adapted numerous times in literature and in popular culture. In Herman Melville's Moby-Dick (1851), Father Mapple delivers a sermon on the Book of Jonah. Mapple asks why Jonah does not show remorse for disobeying God while he is inside of the fish. He comes to the conclusion that Jonah admirably understands that "his dreadful punishment is just." Carlo Collodi's The Adventures of Pinocchio (1883) features the title character and his father Geppetto being swallowed by "the Terrible Dogfish," an allusion to the story of Jonah. Walt Disney's 1940 film adaptation of the novel retains this allusion. The story of Jonah was adapted into Phil Vischer and Mike Nawrocki's animated film Jonah: A VeggieTales Movie (2002). In the film, Jonah is swallowed by a gargantuan whale. The film was Big Idea Entertainment's first full-length theatrical release and it earned approximately $6.5 million on its first weekend.

Suggested connections to legends

Epic of Gilgamesh
Joseph Campbell suggests that the story of Jonah parallels a scene from the Epic of Gilgamesh, in which Gilgamesh obtains a plant from the bottom of the sea. In the Book of Jonah, a worm (in Hebrew tola'ath, "maggot") bites the shade-giving plant's root causing it to wither; whereas in the Epic of Gilgamesh, Gilgamesh ties stones to his feet and plucks his plant from the floor of the sea. Once he returns to the shore, the rejuvenating plant is eaten by a serpent.

Jason from Greek mythology
Campbell also noted several similarities between the story of Jonah and that of Jason in Greek mythology. The Greek rendering of the name Jonah is Jonas (Ἰωνᾶς), which differs from Jason (Ἰάσων) only in the order of sounds—both os are omegas suggesting that Jason may have been confused with Jonah. Gildas Hamel, drawing on the Book of Jonah and Greco-Roman sources—including Greek vases and the accounts of Apollonius of Rhodes, Gaius Valerius Flaccus and Orphic Argonautica—identifies a number of shared motifs, including the names of the heroes, the presence of a dove, the idea of "fleeing" like the wind and causing a storm, the attitude of the sailors, the presence of a sea-monster or dragon threatening the hero or swallowing him, and the form and the word used for the "gourd" (kikayon).

Hamel takes the view that it was the Hebrew author who reacted to and adapted this mythological material to communicate his own, quite different message.

See also
 Aquanaut, a person who stays underwater for a long time
 Biblical and Quranic narratives
 Jonah on the Sistine Chapel ceiling
 Legends and the Quran
 Prophets of Islam
 Qisas Al-Anbiya

Further reading

Notes

References

Bibliography

External links

 Jonah leaving whale
 The Book of Jonah (Hebrew and English)
 The Book of Jonah (NIV)
 
 Prophet Jonah Orthodox icon and synaxarion
 The Prophet Jonah at the Christian Iconography website

Jonah
Christian saints from the Old Testament
Fish and humans
People whose existence is disputed
Satire
Year of birth unknown
Year of death unknown